Klemelä is a Finnish-language surname that may refer to:

 Kosti Klemelä (1920–2006), Finnish actor
 Sanni Klemelä (born 1990), Finnish long-distance runner who competed in the 2010 European Team Championships Super League
 Seppo Väli-Klemelä, Finnish orienteer

References

Finnish-language surnames